The 1932 Navy Midshipmen football team represented the United States Naval Academy during the 1932 college football season. In their second season under head coach Edgar Miller, the Midshipmen compiled a  record and were outscored by opponents by a combined score of

Schedule

References

Navy
Navy Midshipmen football seasons
Navy Midshipmen football